Nutty but Nice is a 1940 short subject directed by Jules White starring American slapstick comedy team The Three Stooges (Moe Howard, Larry Fine and Curly Howard). It is the 47th entry in the series released by Columbia Pictures starring the comedians, who released 190 shorts for the studio between 1934 and 1959.

Plot
The Stooges are working as singing waiters at a restaurant and meet two doctors (Vernon Dent, John Tyrrell) who ask them to cheer up Betty Williams, a little girl who is sick from grief because her father (Ned Glass), a bank cashier, has been kidnapped while delivering $300,000 worth of bonds. The Stooges pay a visit to Betty dressed up as little girls with blonde sausage curls, but they fail to cheer her up. The Stooges then volunteer to go out and find the girl's missing father. The doctors give them a brief description of the father (middle-aged, bald-spot, an anchor tattoo, and 5'10" in his stocking feet). He and Betty like to yodel to each other, something Curly seems rather adept at.

The Stooges waste no time in stopping every suspect in sight and giving them the Stooge third degree. Frustrated, Curly starts yodeling, and after a few maladies that befall him (water, a flower pot, and a chair all crashing on his head), the boys hear a response from a radio that one of the kidnappers, Butch (Cy Schindell), has on. Butch is guarding Betty's father who is gagged and tied to a bed. Mistaking the yodeling cowboy on the radio for the cashier, the Stooges follow the sounds and intercede, knock out Butch, and free Betty's father.

Just then, three other members of the gang return. The Stooges and the father barricade the room door and use the dumbwaiter to escape to the basement. The four men follow them downstairs where a fight ensues, plunging everything into darkness, leaving only Curly fully conscious afterward to light a candle. The cashier is reunited with Betty, who recovers from her lethargy, and the pair, along with the two doctors, are serenaded at the restaurant by the Stooges.

Production notes
Nutty but Nice was filmed from April 27 to May 2, 1940. The film title is a play on the expression, "naughty but nice".

The Stooges often went in drag, but this is the one case of their doing so in a good (as opposed to cowardly) cause.

References

External links 
 
 
Nutty but Nice at threestooges.net

1940 films
The Three Stooges films
American black-and-white films
Films directed by Jules White
1940 comedy films
Columbia Pictures short films
American comedy short films
1940s English-language films
1940s American films